The Lake Charles Championship was a golf tournament on the Korn Ferry Tour. It was first played in March 2022 at The Country Club at the Golden Nugget in Lake Charles, Louisiana; it had been scheduled to be played in 2020, but was canceled due to the COVID-19 pandemic.

Winners

Bolded golfers graduated to the PGA Tour via the Korn Ferry Tour regular-season money list.

References

External links
Coverage on the Korn Ferry Tour's official site

Former Korn Ferry Tour events
Golf in Louisiana
Sports in Lake Charles, Louisiana
2020 establishments in Louisiana
2022 disestablishments in Louisiana